Pete King (also C. Dudley King; August 8, 1914 in Ohio – September 21, 1982) was an American music composer and arranger of easy listening music and film soundtracks. He studied music at the Cincinnati Conservatory and the University of Michigan.

He was elected president of the National Academy of Recording Arts and Sciences in 1967.

King conducted orchestras for a variety of Hollywood films including adapting the works of Edvard Grieg for The Pied Piper of Hamelin and two comedies The Family Jewels and The Last of the Secret Agents.  King's arrangements and cues were heard often in the American television series Happy Days and The Brady Bunch. With his own Pete King Chorale he recorded, among other songs, "Hey, Look Me Over".

He was buried at the Forest Lawn, Hollywood Hills Cemetery in Los Angeles.

References

External links
Pete King at Space Age Pop

1914 births
1982 deaths
American male conductors (music)
American film score composers
American music arrangers
Easy listening musicians
Light music composers
Burials at Forest Lawn Memorial Park (Hollywood Hills)
University of Michigan School of Music, Theatre & Dance alumni
20th-century American conductors (music)
20th-century American composers
American male film score composers
20th-century American male musicians
University of Cincinnati – College-Conservatory of Music alumni